The rufous flycatcher (Myiarchus semirufus) is a bird species in the family Tyrannidae. It is endemic to Peru. Its natural habitats are subtropical or tropical moist lowland forests and subtropical or tropical dry shrubland. It was formerly classified as a species of least concern by the IUCN. But new research has shown it to be much rarer than it was believed. Consequently, it is uplisted to endangered in 2008.

References

External links
BirdLife Species Factsheet.

Myiarchus
Endemic birds of Peru
Birds described in 1878
Taxa named by Philip Sclater
Taxa named by Osbert Salvin
Taxonomy articles created by Polbot